"L'arca di Noè" is a 1970 song composed by Sergio Endrigo. The song premiered at the 20th edition of the Sanremo Music Festival, with a double performance by Endrigo and Iva Zanicchi, and placed at the third place.

"L'arca di Noè" was a commercial success, ranking third on the Italian hit parade and becoming a lasting classic. It was also praised by critics, with the Corriere della Sera musical critic Vincenzo Buonassisi describing it as "the only Sanremo Festival song which tried to say something new, to touch open issues for the consciousness of the people of today".

The main tune derived from Sedi, Mara, na kamen studencu! (Sidi Mara) (Aloha ʻOe!)

A Spanish adaptation of the song, "El Arca de Noé", was recorded by Jimmy Fontana and peaked at the first place on the Argentine hit parade. An English adaptation, titled "When Love Comes Round Again" and performed by Ken Dodd, reached #19 in the UK Singles Chart.

Track listing

 7" single – SP 1423
 "L'arca di Noè"  (Sergio Endrigo)
 "Dall'America" (Sergio Bardotti, Sergio Endrigo)

Charts

References

1970 singles
1970 songs
Italian songs
Sanremo Music Festival songs
Sergio Endrigo songs
Songs written by Sergio Endrigo
Environmental songs